Eucithara makadiensis is a small sea snail, a marine gastropod mollusc in the family Mangeliidae.

Description
The length of the shell attains 6 mm.

Distribution
This marine species occurs in the Red Sea.

References

 Kilburn, R.N.; Dekker, H. (2008). New species of turrid conoideans (Gastropoda, Conoidea) from the Red Sea and Arabia. Basteria, 72(1-3), 1-19

External links
 

makadiensis
Gastropods described in 2008